Scott Austin Fitzkee (born April 8, 1957) is a former professional American football wide receiver. He played in both the National Football League (NFL) and United States Football League (USFL) and starred at Penn State University in 1978. In the NFL, he played for the Philadelphia Eagles and San Diego Chargers, and in the USFL, he played for the Philadelphia/Baltimore Stars.

References

1957 births
Living people
American football wide receivers
Penn State Nittany Lions football players
Philadelphia Eagles players
San Diego Chargers players
Philadelphia/Baltimore Stars players
Sportspeople from York, Pennsylvania
Players of American football from Pennsylvania